Reedy Fork is a  long 2nd order tributary to Hyco Creek in Caswell County, North Carolina.  Reedy Fork joins Hyco Creek within Hyco Lake.

Variant names
According to the Geographic Names Information System, it has also been known historically as:
Reedy Creek Fork
Reedy Fork Creek

Course
Reedy Fork rises in Hightowers, North Carolina and then flows north-northeast to join Hyco Creek about 0.75 miles west of Osmond.

Watershed
Reedy Fork drains  of area, receives about 46.2 in/year of precipitation, has a wetness index of 356.80, and is about 54% forested.

References

Rivers of North Carolina
Rivers of Caswell County, North Carolina
Tributaries of the Roanoke River